Fredriksdal is a locality situated in Nässjö Municipality, Jönköping County, Sweden with 310 inhabitants in 2010.

It hosts the Fredriksdal Museum and Botanical Garden with native regional breeds that are at a risk of extinction.

References

External links

Populated places in Jönköping County
Populated places in Nässjö Municipality